Kmetija 2019 (The Farm 2019) is the ninth season of the Slovene version of The Farm, a reality television show based on the Swedish television series of the similar name. This season 19 ordinary people from across Slovenia will live on the farm, trying to live life as it was 100 years ago and to try and win €50,000. This season's farm is located in Vučja Gomila. It is the largest farm to date with 7 buildings located within a 30 hectare radius of the farm. 6 of which were newly built.  The main twist this season is that out of the 19 contestants, two of them are twins who will compete as one. When one becomes head of the farm, the other is as well. In addition, two contestants (Goran Leban & Jan Klobasa) are returnees of previous seasons of Kmetija.

Finishing order
All contestants entered on Day 1.

The game

References

External links
 https://www.24ur.com/tv-oddaje/kmetija

The Farm (franchise)
2010s Slovenian television series